Grand Canal Dock is a Southside area near the city centre of Dublin, Ireland.  It is located on the border of eastern Dublin 2 and the westernmost part of Ringsend in Dublin 4, surrounding the Grand Canal Docks, an enclosed harbour where the Grand Canal comes to the River Liffey. The area has undergone significant redevelopment since 2000, as part of the Dublin Docklands area redevelopment project.

The area has been nicknamed "Silicon Docks" by Google and Facebook (a reference to Silicon Valley) as it has become a popular location for multinational technology firms such as Google, Facebook, Twitter, LinkedIn, and Airbnb. The area has been the subject of debate over the balance of development and gentrification as well as the subject of derision over the clichéd nature of its new nickname.

Location
There is no precise definition of the Grand Canal Dock area, but it is generally understood to be bounded by the Liffey to the north, South Lotts Road to the east (or Barrow Street if separating South Lotts as its own area), Grand Canal Street to the south, and Macken Street to the west (although some maps show the area including as far west as the corner of Leeson Street and Fitzwilliam Place). Grand Canal Dock contains Grand Canal Dock railway station, the national Waterways Ireland Visitor Centre and a number of notable buildings.

Access
Grand Canal Dock railway station, accessed from Barrow Street, opened in 2001 (although the line has been in use since 1834). In early 2014, five new Dublin Bikes stations were opened in the area.

History
The Grand Canal Docks first opened in 1796, built to a design by William Jessop. Before this development, from medieval times the area was associated with lepers, as recorded in some of the street names such as Misery Hill and Lazer Lane. At the time they were the world's largest docks. They fell into decline within just a few decades, due mostly to reduced canal usage with the arrival of the railways. The landscape was dominated by Dublin Gas Company's mountains of black coal, along with chemical factories, tar pits, bottle factories and iron foundries. However, bakers and millers maintained business along the southern edge of the inner basin. By the 1960s, the Grand Canal Docks were almost completely derelict. 

Around 1987 it was decided that Hanover Quay was too toxic to sell. Regeneration began in 1998, when Bord Gáis sold the Dublin Docklands Development Authority (DDDA) the former gasworks site located in the area between Sir John Rogerson's Quay and Hanover Quay, for €19 million. The DDDA spent €52 million decontaminating the land, even though the likely return was estimated at just €40 million. The decontamination took place under the supervision of the Environmental Protection Agency, between 2002 and 2006. The process involved constructing an underground wall eight metres deep around the affected area, and the contaminated soil being dug out and removed. By the time the decontamination was finished, an inflated property bubble and increased demand in the area (brought on, in part, by the decision by Google to set up its European headquarters nearby), allowed the authority to sell the land for €300 million. The DDDA injected some of its new funds into the area's infrastructure including seats, street lighting, and civic spaces.

A number of significant developments have happened since involving the construction of millions of euros worth of real estate, the arrival of several thousand new residents, and the establishment of what is now sometimes known as Silicon Docks.

Sites control and planning
On 22 May 2014, it was announced that a fast-track planning process was approved by An Bord Pleanala, with 366,000 square metres of office space and 2,600 homes to be developed across 22 hectares of land in the North Lotts and Grand Canal Dock areas under the Docklands Strategic Development Zone (SDZ) planning scheme. A number of site plan notices have been posted in the area including the following:
On 14 October 2014, it was reported that U2 would buy 16 Hanover Quay from the Dublin Docklands Development Authority for €450,000. The authority had forced the band to sell its old riverfront studio on Hanover Quay for an undisclosed price in 2002 to allow the development of the Grand Canal Harbour area. As part of that deal, the authority had promised the band the top two floors of the 32-storey tower it was planning to build on an adjacent quay, a project that was subsequently put on hold. In light of its imminent dissolution and the recent approval by An Bord Plenala for the North Lotts and Grand Canal Planning scheme, the authority decided it would not be proceeding with a proposed compulsory purchase order of 16 and 18 Hanover Quay.
On 4 December 2014, a site plan notice was posted describing the developments to take place at the Boland's Mill site including retaining and restoring old stone buildings to accommodate retail/restaurant/cafe use, cultural/exhibition use, and residences; and the construction of three new towers (13 to 15 storeys, maximum height 53.65m) to accommodate offices and residences. There will also be three new pedestrian routes from Barrow Street, and a new civic waterfront square adjacent to the dock.
On 12 December 2014, two site plan notices were posted for Targeted Investment Opportunities PLC describing the developments to take place at the former Kilsaran Concrete site at 5 Hanover Quay. One notice is for the construction of a 7-storey office building. The other notice is for the construction of a 7-8 storey building to accommodate residences and mixed-use, including 100 apartments, a leisure centre, and space for 1 retail and 2 cafes at ground level.

Buildings
Several of the buildings surrounding Grand Canal Square, such as the Bord Gáis Energy Theatre, The Marker Hotel, and the HQ office development, were designed by McCauley Daye O’Connell Architects.
Notable features of the Grand Canal Dock area include:

Grand Canal Square

Grand Canal Square Square was completed in 2008. The €8 million plaza consists of red resin-glass paving that juts out into the water, dotted with illuminated red poles. Planted sections are arranged diagonally across the square.

Alto Vetro
The Alto Vetro apartment building was awarded the Royal Institute of the Architects of Ireland’s (RIAI) Silver Medal for Housing (2007-2008). It was built by the Montevetro developers Treasury Holdings.

Boland's Mill
Boland's Mill was a functioning mill until 2001, after which the site, including older stone buildings and taller concrete silos, became derelict. , the site is currently undergoing a €150 million reconstruction to become Bolands Quay, accommodating new residences, commercial, retail, and civic spaces.

Bord Gáis Energy Theatre
The Bord Gáis Energy Theatre is the largest theatre in Ireland. It was designed by Polish-American architect Daniel Liebeskind. It was opened as the Grand Canal Theatre in 2010 but renamed in March 2012 as part of a paid naming rights agreement.

The Factory
The Factory houses Irish Film and Television Network studios, as well as rehearsal and recording studios where a number of U2's albums were recorded.

Google Docks
The Montevetro building completed in 2010 stands at a height of 67 metres and is currently the tallest commercial building in Dublin. It was sold to Google in January 2011 and subsequently renamed "Google Docks". In 2014, the Google Docks building was joined by an "iconic" curving three-pronged steel and transparent glass footbridge to Google's two office buildings across Barrow Street - Gordon House and Gasworks House. It has been named "Hyperlink".

The Marker Hotel
The Marker Hotel is owned by development firm Tetrarch Capital and is one of only six of The Leading Hotels of the World in Ireland. It was designed in 2004 by Portuguese architect Manuel Aires Mateus. It opened in 2013 and offers the city's first rooftop terrace and bar.

Millennium Tower
Millennium Tower is an apartment building located on the Grand Canal outer basin. At 63 metres in height, it was the tallest storied building in Dublin from 1998 - 2009.

No. 2, 4, and 5 Grand Canal Square
The modern office buildings alongside the Bord Gáis Energy Theatre were designed by architect Daniel Liebeskind and developed by Chartered Land. No 2 houses offices for Capita Asset Services & William Fry Solicitors. No 4 houses offices for Facebook's European headquarters.

References

Places in Dublin (city)
Dublin Docklands
Ringsend
Office buildings in the Republic of Ireland
Skyscrapers in the Republic of Ireland